The 2013–14 NHL season was the 97th season of operation (96th season of play) of the National Hockey League (NHL). This season features a realignment of the league's 30 teams from a six to a four division format. The regular season began October 1, and concluded April 13. The Stanley Cup playoffs began April 16.

The Los Angeles Kings won their second Stanley Cup championship in franchise history (second in three seasons), defeating the New York Rangers four games to one in the Finals.

League business

Realignment
The relocation of the former Atlanta Thrashers franchise to the current Winnipeg Jets in 2011 prompted the league to discuss realignment. On December 5, 2011, the NHL Board of Governors approved a conference realignment plan that would eliminate the current six-division setup and move into a four-conference structure from the 2012–13 season. Under the plan, which was designed to better accommodate the effects of time zone differences, each team would have played 50 or 54 intra-conference games, depending on whether it was in a seven- or eight-team conference, and two games (home and road) against each non-conference team. On January 6, 2012, the league announced that the NHLPA had rejected the proposed realignment, citing concerns about fairness, travel and the inability to see a draft schedule before approving, and that as a result, it would not implement the realignment until at least 2013–14.

Upon NHLPA rejection of the previous realignment, a new joint NHL-NHLPA plan was proposed in February 2013 as a modification of the previous plan with both the Columbus Blue Jackets and Detroit Red Wings moving to the East and the Winnipeg Jets moving to the West. This revised plan also adjusted the previously proposed four-conference system to a four-division/two-conference system, with the Eastern Conference consisting of two eight-team divisions, and the Western Conference consisting of two seven-team divisions. A new playoff format was also introduced to accommodate the new proposal, with the top three teams in each division making the playoffs, along with two wild-cards in each conference (for a total of 16 playoff teams). The NHLPA officially gave its consent to the NHL's proposed realignment plan on March 7, and then the NHL's Board of Governors approved the realignment and the new playoff format on March 14, to be implemented prior to the 2013–14 season. The league then announced the names of the divisions on July 19: the two eight-team divisions in the Eastern Conference would be the Atlantic Division and the Metropolitan Division, and the two seven-team divisions in the Western Conference would be the Central Division and the Pacific Division.

The new alignment was as follows:

Western Conference

Eastern Conference

Canadian TV deals
The league's Canadian broadcast agreements with CBC and TSN/RDS expired at the end of the season. At the same time, the league had reportedly aimed for its next round of Canadian television contracts to have a value of at least $3.2 billion in total. During negotiations, NHL commissioner Gary Bettman had reportedly recognized the broadcaster's financial difficulties and budget cuts imposed by the federal Conservative government which had decreased CBC's chances of maintaining rights to Hockey Night in Canada and offered CBC a simplified broadcast package which would have consisted of a national doubleheader on Saturday nights (as opposed to regional coverage of multiple games), reduced playoff coverage, and the loss of digital rights and the All-Star Game. Rights to the remaining properties not covered under the CBC's contract would have been offered to other broadcasters. However, CBC Sports' staff, including executive director Jeffrey Orridge, continued to insist that it have exclusivity for every Saturday night game involving Canadian teams. In turn, CBC failed to reach a deal; BCE (owners of Bell Media and previous cable rightsholder TSN and over the air broadcaster, CTV) made a bid for sole national rights to the NHL, and attempted to contact the CBC in regards to forming a partnership. However, CBC Sports' staff did not respond. In turn, Rogers Communications also made a bid of its own.

On November 26, 2013, the NHL announced it had sold twelve seasons' worth of exclusive national broadcast rights to NHL games to Rogers, who would broadcast games across its numerous platforms, including Sportsnet, Sportsnet One, and City, at a price of C$5.2 billion. Hockey Night in Canada would continue on the CBC for the next four seasons; the CBC would give Rogers six hours of free airtime each night to air the broadcasts but paid no rights fee. CBC would be allotted time during the broadcasts to promote its other programming. French language broadcasts were moved to TVA Sports under a sub-licensing deal with Rogers. The moves have left both Bell Media (except for its regional properties) and the CBC (which, in turn, would no longer compete with private broadcasters for professional sports) officially shut out of the national NHL broadcasts.

Rule changes
 All players with fewer than 25 games experience were required to wear visors. The additional minor penalty for instigating a fight when wearing a visor was removed. Players were now assessed an extra minor penalty for unsportsmanlike conduct should they remove their helmet prior to fighting.
Jerseys which were not worn properly (such as being tucked in), and other equipment infractions would now result in a minor penalty.
The base of the goal frame was now shallower and narrower by 4 inches. The overall width of the base of the frame was reduced from 96 to 88 inches and the depth of the base of the frame was reduced from 44 to 40 inches. Additionally, the corners where the goal post meets the crossbar were bent with a smaller radius, allowing more area across the goal plane. The size of the goal itself remains 6 feet wide and 4 feet tall.
The attainable pass exception to the icing rule was removed. Officials would nullify a potential icing only if a player made contact with the puck.
Goaltender's equipment was modified. Pads couldn't rise higher on the goaltender's leg than 45 percent of the distance between the center of the knee and pelvis. The pads could rise no higher than nine inches above the knee for goalies with an upper-leg measurement of 20 inches.
A new hybrid icing rule was adopted. The hybrid icing rule required officials to stop play immediately in a potential icing situation where, in the judgement of the official, the defender would win a race to the puck ahead of an attacker, and the puck would cross the goal line. The official was to make his judgement when a player gains an imaginary line connecting the end-zone faceoff dots. Note that the first player to gain this imaginary line may not have been the one who would win a race to the puck.

Uniforms
The Dallas Stars debuted a new logo, featuring a star with the letter D on it, as well as redesigned uniforms. The green on the uniform was restored as the dominant color, using a brighter shade called "Victory Green," reminiscent of the team before their move to Dallas, thus making the colors easier to distinguish.
The Nashville Predators add a slightly tapered gold stripe to the pants and they reverse the color pattern on their road socks. Previously, the color pattern matched that of the ends of the sleeves.
The Anaheim Ducks introduced a replica of their inaugural 1993–94 jersey to wear in a regular season game against the Ottawa Senators on October 13.
The Anaheim Ducks, Florida Panthers, and Boston Bruins were all wearing special patches to commemorate their first season in the NHL. The Ducks and Panthers were each wearing 20th season patches, and the Bruins were wearing 90th season patches. The Bruins' commemorative patch features six stars which signify the franchise's six Stanley Cup victories.
The Carolina Hurricanes debuted a new uniform design that features different striping patterns on the home and away jerseys.
The Toronto Maple Leafs and Detroit Red Wings wore specialized jerseys for the 2014 Winter Classic.
The Los Angeles Kings and Pittsburgh Penguins retired their third jerseys.
The San Jose Sharks modified their home and away jerseys.
The Minnesota Wild changed their away jersey.
The Buffalo Sabres added a new third jersey, featuring a gold front and navy back.
The Calgary Flames retired their throwback third, and added a new third jersey partially inspired by Western wear.
The New York Islanders, New York Rangers, Chicago Blackhawks, Pittsburgh Penguins, Los Angeles Kings and Anaheim Ducks each unveiled new jerseys featuring chromed logos for the 2014 Stadium Series.
Although the New Jersey Devils also introduced a chromed version of their original red and green logo, they wore their red and green throwback jerseys unaltered (save for a Stadium Series patch) for their Stadium Series game against the Rangers.
The Ottawa Senators and Vancouver Canucks wore specialized jerseys for the 2014 Heritage Classic. The Canucks reused the 1915 Vancouver Millionaires design from the previous season, while the Senators wore an off-white version of their black third jersey.

Regular season

With realignment, a new scheduling format was introduced. Among the changes, the scheduling of inter-conference games ensured that all 30 teams would play in all 30 arenas at least once per season. Each team played 82 games – 50 or 54 games within their conference, depending on whether they were in a seven- or eight-team division, and two games (home and road) against each non-conference club. The regular season opened on October 1, 2013, with the first game seeing the Toronto Maple Leafs defeat the home team Montreal Canadiens by a score of 4–3.

The annual Christmas trade freeze was in effect from December 20, 2013, through December 26, 2013.

Olympics

There was no all-star game this season, due to the 2014 Winter Olympics in Sochi, Russia. Prior to the season, NHL, International Ice Hockey Federation (IIHF) and Olympic officials reached an agreement to send NHL players to the Olympics. The league took a break on February 9 and resumed play on February 25. All players participating in their respective national teams gathered in four U.S. airports and flew to Sochi on February 9 and 10.

Winter Classic

The 2014 NHL Winter Classic was held on January 1, 2014. The game, the sixth Winter Classic, featured the Toronto Maple Leafs and the Detroit Red Wings at Michigan Stadium at the University of Michigan in Ann Arbor, Michigan. The game was originally planned to be played on January 1, 2013, as the 2013 NHL Winter Classic, but was postponed due to the 2012–13 NHL lockout.

HBO once again produced a four-part documentary chronicling the preparation of the two teams for the Winter Classic as part of its sports series 24/7 The special also aired in Canada on Sportsnet.

Heritage Classic returns

The 2014 NHL Heritage Classic featured the Ottawa Senators facing off against the home team Vancouver Canucks at BC Place in Vancouver, British Columbia. This was third Heritage Classic game held in Canada following the Heritage Classic in 2011 when the Calgary Flames defeated the Montreal Canadiens 4–0 at McMahon Stadium in Calgary, Alberta. Unlike previous Heritage Classics, the 2014 event was technically held indoors; BC Place kept its retractable roof closed because of inclement weather.

Debut of the Stadium Series

On May 1, 2013, the NHL announced that the Chicago Blackhawks would host the Pittsburgh Penguins at Soldier Field in Chicago on March 1, 2014, as part of the new NHL Stadium Series. The NHL announced an unprecedented six outdoor NHL games for the 2013–14 season: one Winter Classic, four Stadium Series games, and a Heritage Classic game.

For the two Stadium Series games they were involved in at Yankee Stadium, the New York Rangers were the away team due to contract obligations with Madison Square Garden as they can't receive income from other venues in New York as the home team (this claim is dubious as Madison Square Garden owns the team and could theoretically waive that clause with its own team at any time).

The six outdoor games were:

On November 18, 2013, the league announced NHL Revealed: A Season Like No Other, a new seven-part series showing behind-the-scenes footage of top NHL players during the season. The program followed multiple players as they competed in the regular season, the Stadium Series, the Heritage Classic, and the Sochi Olympics. Unlike 24/7, language by players and coaches would be censored. The program aired in the United States on the NBC Sports Network starting on January 22, and in Canada on CBC starting on January 23.

Postponed games
The Carolina Hurricanes-Buffalo Sabres game originally scheduled for January 7 was postponed due to the 2014 North American cold wave. It was rescheduled for February 25.

The Philadelphia Flyers postponed their game against the Hurricanes from January 21 to 22 due to the city of Philadelphia declaring a snow emergency. This resulted in the Hurricanes postponing their match with the Ottawa Senators from January 24 to 25 due to a rule stating that a team cannot play games on three consecutive days.

The Dallas Stars postponed their March 10 game versus the Columbus Blue Jackets after Dallas player Rich Peverley, who had a history of heart problems, collapsed while on the players' bench midway through the first period, with Columbus leading 1–0. The game was abandoned at that point. This game was rescheduled for April 9. The game ran for 60 minutes, with Columbus leading 1–0 to start the game with a goal credited to Nathan Horton and assists credited to Matt Calvert and James Wisniewski. All other statistics were expunged. In the rescheduled game, the Blue Jackets won 3–1. This mirrors the actions taken by the league during a game between the Detroit Red Wings and Nashville Predators on November 21, 2005.

Standings

Tie Breakers:
 Fewer number of games played.
 Greater Regulation + OT Wins (ROW)
 Greater number of points earned in head-to-head play. (If teams played an unequal # of head-to-head games, the result of the first game on the home ice of the team with the extra home game is discarded.)
Columbus were given a higher wild card seed than Detroit due to a higher amount of ROW's (38 to 34)

Player statistics

Scoring leaders
The following players led the league in regular season points.

Leading goaltenders
The following goaltenders led the league in regular season goals against average while playing at least 1800 minutes.

Playoffs

Bracket

NHL awards 

Awards were presented at the NHL Awards ceremony in Las Vegas, Nevada on June 24, 2014. Finalists for voted awards were announced during the playoffs. Voting concluded immediately after the end of the regular season. The Presidents' Trophy, the Prince of Wales Trophy and Clarence S. Campbell Bowl were not presented at the awards ceremony. The Lester Patrick Trophy was announced during the summer and presented in the fall.

All-Star teams

Milestones

First games

The following is a list of notable players who played their first NHL game during the 2013–14 season, listed with their first team:

Last games

The following is a list of players of note who played their last NHL game in 2013–14, listed with their team:

Major milestones reached
On October 2, 2013, the Buffalo Sabres had four people under 20 years old (Mikhail Grigorenko, Zemgus Girgensons, Rasmus Ristolainen and Nikita Zadorov) on their active roster, the most on any NHL team's Opening Night roster since the 1995–96 season.
On October 3, 2013, Boston Bruins forward Chris Kelly became the first player in NHL history to score a team's first goal of the season on a penalty shot against the Tampa Bay Lightning at TD Garden.
On October 17, 2013, Edmonton Oilers forward Taylor Hall broke Wayne Gretzky's franchise record when he scored twice in eight seconds. Gretzky had held the franchise record for fastest two goals by one player since December 18, 1981, when he scored twice in nine seconds.
On October 19, 2013, Phoenix Coyotes goaltender Mike Smith became the 11th goaltender in league history to score a goal when he scored against the Detroit Red Wings.
On October 29, 2013, New Jersey Devils forward Jaromir Jagr scored his 119th career game-winning goal, surpassing Phil Esposito's 118 as the most game-winning goals since the 1967 NHL expansion.
On November 19, 2013, Tampa Bay Lightning forward Martin St. Louis participated in his 1,000th NHL game.
On December 18, 2013, New Jersey Devils forward Jaromir Jagr scored his 122nd career game-winning goal, the most in league history. Gordie Howe held that record dating back to the 1967 season.
On December 31, 2013, Anaheim Ducks forward Andrew Cogliano became the 20th player in league history to play 500 consecutive games, and the fifth to do so to start his career.
On February 1, 2014, Los Angeles Kings defenceman Robyn Regehr participated in his 1,000th NHL game.
On March 1, 2014, New Jersey Devils forward Jaromir Jagr scored his 700th career goal, becoming the seventh player in league history to reach this milestone.
On March 3, 2014, Dallas Stars coach Lindy Ruff recorded his 600th career regular season win against his former team the Buffalo Sabres, becoming the 12th coach to reach this milestone.
On March 6, 2014, Colorado Avalanche forward Nathan MacKinnon broke one of Wayne Gretzky's records by earning a point in his 13th consecutive game, as the longest point streak by an 18-year-old. Gretzky had held the record for most consecutive points by an 18-year-old since the 1979–80 NHL season.
On March 9, 2014, New York Rangers goaltender Henrik Lundqvist recorded his 300th career win, becoming the 29th goaltender to reach this milestone.
On March 11, 2014, Minnesota Wild forward Matt Cooke participated in his 1,000th NHL game.
On March 12, 2014, Vancouver Canucks forward Henrik Sedin participated in his 1,000th NHL game.
On March 18, 2014, New York Rangers goaltender Henrik Lundqvist passed Mike Richter to achieve the most wins in franchise history with his 302nd career victory.
On March 19, 2014, Chicago Blackhawks coach Joel Quenneville recorded his 700th career regular season win, becoming the third coach to reach this milestone.
On March 19, 2014, Chicago Blackhawks forward Michal Handzus participated in his 1,000th NHL game.
On March 20, 2014, Los Angeles Kings coach Darryl Sutter recorded his 500th career regular season win, becoming the 18th coach to reach this milestone.
On March 22, 2014, New York Rangers goaltender Henrik Lundqvist passed Eddie Giacomin to become the franchise's all-time shutout leader with his 50th shutout.
On March 22, 2014, Los Angeles Kings goaltender Jonathan Quick passed Rogie Vachon to become the franchise's all-time wins leader with his 172nd win.
On April 10, 2014, Colorado Avalanche goaltender Semyon Varlamov set a franchise record for wins in a season with his 41st victory. He surpassed former goalie and current head coach Patrick Roy's record of 40 set during the 2000–01 NHL season.
On April 10, 2014, Nashville Predators goaltender Pekka Rinne passed Tomas Vokoun to become the franchises's all-time wins leader with his 162nd win.
On April 11, 2014, the Buffalo Sabres dressed their ninth goaltender of the season, an NHL record (Ryan Miller, Jhonas Enroth, Michal Neuvirth, Nathan Lieuwen, Jaroslav Halak, Matt Hackett, Andrey Makarov, Connor Knapp and Ryan Vinz).
On April 11, 2014, Tampa Bay Lightning goaltender Kristers Gudlevskis made his NHL debut thus becoming the first player in history to play in ECHL, AHL, NHL and Olympic Games during one season.
On May 13, 2014, New York Rangers center Brad Richards notched his seventh career Game 7 Stanley Cup playoffs win. Consequently, Richards was now 7–0 lifetime in Game 7s, tying former Toronto Maple Leafs defenceman Red Kelly in this league milestone.

References

External links

2013–14 NHL season Schedule

 
1
1